Bruce Boston (born 1943) is an American speculative fiction writer and poet.

Early years
Bruce Boston was born in Chicago and grew up in Southern California. He received a B.A. in economics from the University of California, Berkeley in 1965, and an M.A. in 1967. He lived in the San Francisco Bay Area from 1961 to 2001, where he worked in a variety of occupations, including computer programmer, college professor (literature and creative writing, John F. Kennedy University, Orinda, California, 1978–82), technical writer, book designer, gardener, movie projectionist, retail clerk, and furniture mover.

According to Boston, he meant to major in math at university and write on the side, but soon found that he was more interested in writing. After being advised by a friend that he should not major in English to become a writer, he decided on economics  instead.

Writing career
Boston has won the Rhysling Award for speculative poetry a record seven times, and the Asimov's Readers' Award for poetry a record seven times. He has also received a Pushcart Prize for fiction, 1976, a record four Bram Stoker Awards for solo poetry collections, and the first Grand Master Award of the Science Fiction Poetry Association, 1999. His collaborative poem with Robert Frazier, "Return to the Mutant Rain Forest," received first place in the 2006 Locus Online Poetry Poll for Best All-Time Science Fiction, Fantasy, or Horror Poem.

Boston has also published more than a hundred short stories and the novels Stained Glass Rain and The Guardener's Tale (the latter a Bram Stoker Award Finalist and Prometheus Award Nominee). His work has appeared widely in periodicals and anthologies, including Asimov's SF Magazine, Amazing Stories Magazine, Analog, Realms of Fantasy, Science Fiction Age, Weird Tales, Strange Horizons, Year's Best Fantasy and Horror, and the Nebula Awards Showcase. Writing in The Washington Post, Paul Di Filippo described his collection Masque of Dreams as containing "nearly two dozen brilliant stories ranging across all emotional and narrative terrains."

Boston has chaired the Nebula Award Novel Jury (SFWA), the Bram Stoker Award Novel Jury, and the Philip K. Dick Award Jury, and served as Secretary and Treasurer of the Science Fiction Poetry Association. He has served as fiction and/or poetry editor for a number of publications, including Occident, The Open Cell, Berkeley Poets Cooperative, City Miner, Star*Line and The Pedestal Magazine.

He was the poet guest of honor at the World Horror Convention in 2013.

Personal life
As of 2022 Boston was living in Ocala, Florida, with his wife, writer-artist Marge Simon, whom he married in 2001.

Bibliography

Novels 

El Guardián de Almas, Spanish-language edition of The Guardener's Tale, La Factoria de Ideas, 2009

Novelettes 

After Magic. Eotu, 1990, Dark Regions, 1999
Houses. Talisman, 1991

Fiction and poetry collections 

The Complete Accursed Wives, Talisman/Dark Regions, 2000
Masque of Dreams, Wildside, 2001, 2009
Bruce Boston: Short Stories, Volume 1 (ebook), Fictionwise, 2003
Bruce Boston: Short Stories, Volume 2 (ebook), Fictionwise, 2003
Visions of the Mutant Rain Forest (with Robert Frazier), Crystal Lake Publishing, 2017

Fiction collections 

Jackbird. BPW&P, 1976
She Comes When You're Leaving. BPW&P, 1982
Skin Trades, Chris Drumm, 1988
Hypertales & Metafictions. Chris Drumm, 1990
All the Clocks Are Melting (single story booklet), Pulphouse Publishing, 1991
Night Eyes. Chris Drumm, 1993
Dark Tales & Light. Dark Regions, 1999
Flashing the Dark. Sam's Dot Publishing, 2006
Gallimaufry. Plum White Press, 2021

Poetry

Collections 

XXO. Maya Press, 1969
Potted Poems. Maya Press, 1970
All the Clock Are Melting. Velocities, 1984
Alchemical Texts. Ocean View, 1985
Nuclear Futures. Velocities, 1987
Time. Titan, 1988
The Nightmare Collector. 2AM Publications, 1989
Faces of the Beast. Starmont House, 1990
Other Voices, Other Worlds (audio tape, music by Jack Poley). Chris Drumm, 1990, (MP3 audio) Telltale Weekly, 2004
Short Circuits (prose poems). Ocean View, 1991
Cybertexts. Talisman, 1991
 
Accursed Wives. Night Visions, 1993
Specula: Selected Uncollected Poems, 1968-1993. Talisman, 1993
Sensuous Debris: Selected Poems, 1970-1995. Dark Regions, 1995
Conditions of Sentient Life. Gothic Press, 1996
Cold Tomorrows. Gothic Press, 1998
Pavane for a Cyber-Princess (single poem chapbook). Miniature Sun, 2001
White Space. Dark Regions, 2001
Quanta: Award Winning Poems. Miniature Sun, 2001
Night Smoke (ebook, with Marge Simon), Miniature Sun & Quixsilver, 2002
She Was There for Him the Last Time (single poem chapbook). Miniature Sun, 2002
Head Full of Strange (ebook). CyberPulp, 2003
Pitchblende. Dark Regions, 2003
Etiquette with Your Robot Wife. Talisman, 2005
Shades Fantastic. Gromagon Press, 2006
Night Smoke (with Marge Simon, expanded print edition of 2002 ebook). Kelp Queen Press, 2007
The Nightmare Collection. Dark Regions, 2008
Double Visions (collaborative poems). Dark Regions, 2009
North Left of Earth. Sam's Dot, 2009
Dark Matters. Bad Moon Books, 2010
Surrealities. Dark Regions, 2011
Anthropomorphisms. Elektrik Milk Bath Press, 2012
Notes from the Shadow City (with Gary William Crawford). Dark Regions, 2012
Dark Roads: Selected Long Poems 1971-2012. Dark Renaissance Books, 2013
Resonance Dark & Light. Eldritch Press, 2015
Sacrificial Nights (with Alessandro Manzetti). Kipple Officina Libraria, 2016
Brief Encounters with My Third Eye: Selected Short Poems 1975-2016. Crystal Lake Publishing, 2016, Korean-language edition,  Philyohanchaek, 2021
Artifacts. Independent Legions, 2018
Spacers Snarled in the Hair of Comets. Mind's Eye Publications, 2022

Broadsides 

Musings. Eldritch Emu Press, 1988
The Last Existentialist. Chris Drumm, 1993
Confessions of a Body Thief. Talisman, 1998
The Lesions of Genetic Sin. Miniature Sun, 2000
In Far Pale Clarity. Quixsilver, 2002
The Crow Is Dismantled in Flight (ebroadside). Miniature Sun, 2003

Major awards and honors

Bram Stoker Award for Poetry Collection
 2003  Pitchblende, Dark Regions Press
 2006  Shades Fantastic, Gromagon Press
 2008  The Nightmare Collection, Dark Regions Press
 2010  Dark Matters, Bad Moon Books

Asimov’s Readers Award for Poetry
 1989  Old Robots Are the Worst
 1993  Curse of the Shapeshifter's Wife
 1997  Curse of the SF Writer's Wife
 2003  Eight Things Not to Do or Say When a Mad Scientist Moves into Your Neighborhood
 2005  Heavy Weather
 2007  The Dimensional Rush of Relative Primes
 2014  In the Quiet Hour

Rhysling Award for Speculative Poetry (SFPA)
 1985  For Spacers Snarled in the Hair of Comets, short
 1987  The Nightmare Collector, short
 1988  In the Darkened Hours, long
 1994  Spacer's Compass, short
 1995  Future Present: A Lesson in Expectation, short
 1999  Confessions of a Body Thief, long
 2001  My Wife Returns as She Would Have It, short

Others
 1976  Pushcart Prize for Fiction for “Broken Portraiture”
 1999  Grandmaster Award, Science Fiction Poetry Association
 2006  Winner of Locus Poll for Favorite SF, Fantasy, Horror Poem -- "Return to the Mutant Rain Forest" with Robert Frazier
 2013  Poet Guest of Honor, World Horror/Bram Stoker Awards Convention, New Orleans

References

External links
Bruce Boston's website
Interview by John Amen at The Pedestal Magazine
Interview by JoSelle Vanderhooft at Strange Horizons
 Bruce Boston at Smashwords
Songs of the Stars, Songs of the Dark Retrospective essay on Boston's poetry by Gary William Crawford

1943 births
Living people
21st-century American male writers
21st-century American novelists
John F. Kennedy University faculty
American male novelists
American science fiction writers
Analog Science Fiction and Fact people
Asimov's Science Fiction people
Projectionists
Retail clerks
Rhysling Award for Best Long Poem winners
Rhysling Award for Best Short Poem winners
Writers from California
Writers from the San Francisco Bay Area